Tom Raftery (born 15 August 1933) is a former Irish Fine Gael politician and university professor. He was elected to the European Parliament at the 1984 European election for the Munster constituency. He lost his seat at the 1989 European election but was elected to the Seanad at the 1989 Seanad election for the Administrative Panel. He failed to retain his Seanad seat at the 1992 election. He stood unsuccessfully in the Munster constituency at the 1994 European election.

References

External links

1933 births
Living people
Fine Gael senators
Members of the 19th Seanad
Fine Gael MEPs
MEPs for the Republic of Ireland 1984–1989